William A. Kasten (born September 25, 1956) is a former member of the Wisconsin State Assembly.

Biography
Kasten was born in Wausau, Wisconsin. After graduating from high school in Mosinee, Wisconsin, Kasten attended the United States Naval Academy before transferring to the University of Wisconsin-Madison.

Career
Kasten was elected to the Assembly in 1982 and re-elected in 1984. He is a Republican.

References

Politicians from Wausau, Wisconsin
Republican Party members of the Wisconsin State Assembly
Military personnel from Wisconsin
United States Naval Academy alumni
University of Wisconsin–Madison alumni
1956 births
Living people